Pluviostilla is a monospecific genus of sea snails, marine gastropod mollusks in the family Neritopsidae. The sole species is Pluviostilla palauensis.

References

Neritopsidae
Monotypic gastropod genera